The 1949 World Table Tennis Championships women's singles was the 16th edition of the women's singles championship.
Gizi Farkas defeated Květa Hrušková in the final by three sets to one, to win claim a third consecutive title.

Results

+ Time limit rule applied

See also
List of World Table Tennis Championships medalists

References

-
1949 in women's table tennis